A by-election was held for the New South Wales Legislative Assembly electorate of Cobar on 11 May 1918 because of the death of Charles Fern.

Dates

Result

The by-election was caused by the death of Charles Fern.

See also
Electoral results for the district of Cobar
List of New South Wales state by-elections

References

1918 elections in Australia
New South Wales state by-elections
1910s in New South Wales